Meza leucophaea, the margined missile, is a butterfly in the family Hesperiidae. It is found in Senegal, Guinea, Sierra Leone, Liberia, Ivory Coast, Ghana, Nigeria, Cameroon and Gabon. The habitat consists of forests.

Adults have been recorded feeding from the blossoms of a low-growing species of Pterocarpus.

Subspecies
Meza leucophaea leucophaea (eastern Nigeria, Cameroon, Gabon)
Meza leucophaea bassa Lindsey & Miller, 1965 (Senegal, Guinea, Sierra Leone, Liberia, Ivory Coast, Ghana, western Nigeria)

References

Butterflies described in 1894
Erionotini
Butterflies of Africa